Millionaire is a business simulation game originally written for the ZX Spectrum by John Hunt and ported to the Acorn Electron and BBC Micro. The objective is to become a software millionaire and avoid bankruptcy.

Gameplay 
Millionaire is a text-based management game in which the player takes the role of a home-based games programmer who has written a program and must market it to the retailers. Starting with an investment of £500, the player uses this money to pay advertisers and cover tape duplication costs. Meanwhile, new games must be written and promoted while keeping costs down. The style of game that could be programmed included arcade, adventure, and strategy.

The player then has to allocate 20 management points to spread amongst programming, presentation, original ideas, and maintaining player interest.

A character called Honest Harry who can offer deals such as cheap cassettes, which will lessen distribution costs, or programs. Sometimes, these deals are not so good as the programs could be bugged or stolen, having negative effect.

Progress in the game is monitored by observing the sales figures at the end of each month. If the player makes enough money the a screenshot of a bigger and better house/office is displayed. Chance plays a role; certain events will affect sales positively or negatively.

Reception

See also 
Software Star

References

External links

Millionaire at GameFAQs

1984 video games
BBC Micro and Acorn Electron games
Business simulation games
Europe-exclusive video games
Incentive Software games
Single-player video games
Video games developed in the United Kingdom
ZX Spectrum games